Anka Krizmanić, also known as Anka Krizmanic-Paulic (1896–1987) was a Croatian painter and printmaker, and later scientific illustrator. She was active between 1910 and 1946.

About 
She attended a private painting school at Krizman School of Painting in Zagreb, studying under Tomislav Krizman. She continued her studies between 1913 until 1917 at Kunstgewerbeschule in Dresden, Germany, followed by studies in Paris from 1920 until 1930. In 1921 and 1922, she worked on creating lithographic maps of Dubrovnik, while staying in that city Her painting work had two major series, one of which was "dance" and was inspired dancers by Anna Pavlova, Grete Wiesenthal, and Gertrud Leistikow. The other series was "lovers".

In 1935, she met German painter  (1904–1945) and a romance was started between them. By the beginning of World War II (c.1939), the relationship ended. 

In 1946, she became a scientific illustrator for the School of Medicine in Zagreb, and she lessened her time painting.

References

External links 
 Anka Krizmanić on AskArt.com
Anka Krizmanic on ArtNet.com

1896 births
1987 deaths
Artists from Zagreb
Croatian painters
Croatian printers
Croatian women painters
Scientific illustrators